Riccardo Marchizza (born 26 March 1998) is an Italian professional footballer who plays as a centre-back for Serie A club Sassuolo.

Club career

Roma
Born in Rome in 1998, Marchizza joined A.S. Roma's youth academy in 2006, at the age of eight.

In July 2016, Marchizza was called up for Roma's first team during the pre-season training camp and  scored the winning goal in a friendly game against Terek Grozny. On 8 December 2016, Marchizza made his senior debut against Astra Giurgiu on matchday six of the 2016–17 UEFA Europa League group stage; with Roma already advanced, he replaced Emerson in the 89th minute.

Sassuolo
In July 2017, Marchizza and Davide Frattesi were signed by Sassuolo for a total fee of €8 million, as part of the deal for Grégoire Defrel. In August 2017, Marchizza was loaned to Serie B club Avellino. On 25 July 2018, he signed with Crotone on loan until 30 June 2019. On 15 July 2019, he joined Spezia on loan.

International career
Marchizza took part at the 2017 FIFA U-20 World Cup with the Italy U20 team, reaching the third place.

He made his debut with the Italy U21 team on 11 September 2018, in a friendly match won 3–1 against Albania.

Personal life 
On 12 October 2020, he tested positive for COVID-19.

Career statistics

Club

Honours
Italy U20
FIFA U-20 World Cup bronze medals: 2017

References

Living people
1998 births
Italian footballers
Footballers from Rome
Association football defenders
Italy youth international footballers
Italy under-21 international footballers
Serie A players
Serie B players
A.S. Roma players
U.S. Avellino 1912 players
F.C. Crotone players
Spezia Calcio players
Empoli F.C. players